The 2016 Thai League T1 (also known as the Toyota Thai League for sponsorship reasons) was the 20th season of the Thai League T1, the top Thai professional league for association football clubs, since its establishment in 1996. A total of 18 teams competed in the league. The season started on 5 March 2016.

Buriram United are the defending champions, having won the Thai Premier League title the three consecutive seasons.

Following the death of King Bhumibol Adulyadej, the Football Association of Thailand cancelled the remaining league season on 14 October 2016, with three rounds remaining. Muangthong United were therefore crowned champions with BBCU, Chainat and Army United relegated.

The following day however (15 October), FAT appeared to do a U-turn and announced that further discussions with key stake holders would determine whether the league campaign would continue. These discussions were required as teams that were in the relegation places at the time of the original announcement were voicing their concerns.

On the 16 October, after a meeting of all top flight league clubs it was announced that the original decision to cancel the remaining games would stay in place, therefore crowning Muangthong United as champions for the 4th time.

Teams

A total of 18 teams will contest the league, including 15 sides from the 2015 season and three promoted from the 2015 Thai Division 1 League.

TOT and Port were relegated to the 2016 Thai Division 1 League after finishing the 2015 season. 14th-placed Saraburi withdrew from the league after the season, sparing BEC Tero Sasana from relegation. They were replaced by the best three teams from the 2015 Thai Division 1 League runners-up Pattaya United, third place Sukhothai and fourth place BBCU.

Stadiums and locations
Note: Table lists in alphabetical order.

Name changes
Osotspa Samut Prakan renamed themselves to Super Power Samut Prakan.

Stadium changes
Bangkok United used the Thammasat Stadium in Pathumthani,  a change from the previous season where they used the Thai-Japanese Stadium in Bangkok as their home ground in 2015.
Ratchaburi Mitr Phol will use the Mitr Phol Stadium in June 2016,  a change from the previous season where they used the Ratchaburi Stadium in Ratchaburi as their home ground in 2015.
Sukhothai used the TOT Stadium Chaeng Watthana in Bangkok for the visit of Buriram United due to a home stadium ban.
Muangthong United used the Supachalasai Stadium in Bangkok for the visit of BBCU due to a home stadium ban.

Personnel and sponsoring
Note: Flags indicate national team as has been defined under FIFA eligibility rules. Players may hold more than one non-FIFA nationality.

Managerial changes

Foreign players
The number of foreign players is restricted to five per Thai League T1 team. A team can use four foreign players on the field in each game, including at least one player from the AFC country.

Former player are the players who were out of Thai League T1 squad/left club in the mid-season transfer window.

Results

League table

Positions by round

Result table

Season statistics

Top scorersAs of 25 September 2016. * Transferred to Al-Shabab after 20 weeks.

Top assistsAs of 25 September 2016.Hat-tricks

Clean sheetsAs of 25 September 2016.''

Awards

Monthly awards

Attendances

See also
 2016 Thai Division 1 League
 2016 Regional League Division 2
 2016 Football Division 3
 2016 Thai FA Cup
 2016 Thai League Cup
 2016 Kor Royal Cup
 Thai Premier League All-Star Football
 List of foreign Thai League 1 players

References

2016
2015–16 in Asian association football leagues
2016–17 in Asian association football leagues